The free software movement is a social movement with the goal of obtaining and guaranteeing certain freedoms for software users, namely the freedoms to run, study, modify, and share copies of software. Software which meets these requirements, The Four Essential Freedoms of Free Software, is termed free software.

Although drawing on traditions and philosophies among members of the 1970s hacker culture and academia, Richard Stallman formally founded the movement in 1983 by launching the GNU Project. Stallman later established the Free Software Foundation in 1985 to support the movement.

Philosophy 

The philosophy of the movement is that the use of computers should not lead to people being prevented from cooperating with each other. In practice, this means rejecting proprietary software, which imposes such restrictions, and promoting free software, with the ultimate goal of liberating everyone in cyberspace – that is, every computer user. Stallman notes that this action will promote rather than hinder the progression of technology, since, "It means that much wasteful duplication of system programming effort will be avoided. This effort can go instead into advancing the state of the art."

Members of the free software movement believe that all users of software should have the freedoms listed in The Free Software Definition. Many of them hold that: it is immoral to prohibit or prevent people from exercising these freedoms; these freedoms are required to create a decent society where software users can help each other; and they are necessary to have control over their computers.

Some free software users and programmers do not believe that proprietary software is strictly immoral, citing an increased profitability in the business models available for proprietary software or technical features and convenience as their reasons.

The Free Software Foundation also believes all software needs free documentation, in particular because conscientious programmers should be able to update manuals to reflect modification that they made to the software, but deems the freedom to modify less important for other types of written works. Within the free software movement, the FLOSS Manuals foundation specialises on the goal of providing such documentation. Members of the free software movement advocate that works which serve a practical purpose should also be free.

Actions

Writing and spreading free software 
The core work of the free software movement is focused on software development. The free software movement also rejects proprietary software, refusing to install software that does not give them the freedoms of free software. According to Stallman, "The only thing in the software field that is worse than an unauthorised copy of a proprietary program, is an authorised copy of the proprietary program because this does the same harm to its whole community of users, and in addition, usually the developer, the perpetrator of this evil, profits from it."

Building awareness 
Some supporters of the free software movement take up public speaking, or host a stall at software-related conferences to raise awareness of software freedom. This is seen as important since people who receive free software, but who are not aware that it is free software, will later accept a non-free replacement or will add software that is not free software.

Organisations

Asia 

 Free Software Movement of India
 International Centre for Free and Open Source Software (ICFOSS)

Africa 

 Free Software and Open Source Foundation for Africa

North America 

 Free Software Foundation
 Software Freedom Law Center

South America 

 Free Software Foundation Latin America
 Software Livre Brasil

Europe 

 Free Software Foundation Europe
 Framasoft
 Irish Free Software Organisation

Australia 

 Free Software Australia

Legislation and government 
A lot of lobbying work has been done against software patents and expansions of copyright law. Other lobbying focuses directly on the use of free software by government agencies and government-funded projects.

Asia

India 
Government of India had issued Policy on Adoption of Open Source Software for Government of India in 2015 to drive uptake within the government. With the vision to transform India as a Software Product Nation, National Policy on Software Products-2019 was approved by the Government.

North America

United States 
In the United States, there have been efforts to pass legislation at the state level encouraging the use of free software by state government agencies.

South America

Peru 
Congressmen Edgar David Villanueva and Jacques Rodrich Ackerman have been instrumental in introducing free software in Peru, with bill 1609 on "Free Software in Public Administration". The incident invited the attention of Microsoft, Peru, whose general manager wrote a letter to Villanueva. His response received worldwide attention and is seen as a classic piece of argumentation favouring use of free software in governments.

Uruguay 
Uruguay has a sanctioned law requiring that the state give priority to free software. It also requires that information be exchanged in open formats.

Venezuela 
The Government of Venezuela implemented a free software law in January 2006. Decree No. 3,390 mandated all government agencies to migrate to free software over a two-year period.

Europe 
Publiccode.eu is a campaign launched demanding a legislation requiring that publicly financed software developed for the public sector be made publicly available under a Free and Open Source Software licence. If it is public money, it should be public code as well.

France 
The French Gendarmerie and the French National Assembly utilize the open source operating system Linux.

United Kingdom 
Gov.uk keeps a list of "key components, tools and services that have gone into the construction of GOV.UK".

Events 

Free Software events happening all around the world connects people to increase visibility for Free software projects and foster collaborations.

Economics
The free software movement has been extensively analyzed using economic methodologies, including perspectives from heterodox economics. Of particular interest to economists is the willingness of programmers in the free software movement to work, .

In his 1998 article "The High-Tech Gift Economy", Richard Barbrook suggested that the then-nascent free software movement represented a return to the gift economy building on hobbyism and the absence of economic scarcity on the internet.

Gabriella Coleman has emphasized the importance of accreditation, respect, and honour within the free software community as a form of compensation for contributions to projects, over and against financial motivations.

The Swedish Marxian economist Johan Söderberg has argued that the free software movement represents a complete alternative to capitalism that may be expanded to create a post-work society. He argues that the combination of a manipulation of intellectual property law and private property to make goods available to the public and a thorough blend between labor and fun make the free software movement a communist economy.

Subgroups and schisms 
Since its inception, there is an ongoing contension between the many FLOSS organizations (FSF, OSI, Debian, Mozilla Foundation, Apache Foundation, etc.) within the free software movement, with the main conflicts centered around the organization's needs for compromise and pragmatism rather than adhering to founding values and philosophies.

Open source 

The Open Source Initiative (OSI) was founded in February 1998 by Eric Raymond and Bruce Perens to promote the term "open-source software" as an alternative term for free software. The OSI aimed to address the perceived shortcomings and ambiguity of the term "free software", as well as shifting the focus of free software from a social and ethical issue to instead emphasize open source as a superior model for software development. The latter became the view of Eric Raymond and Linus Torvalds, while Bruce Perens argued that open source was meant to popularize free software under a new brand and called for a return to basic ethical principles.

Some free software advocates use the terms "Free and Open-Source Software" (FOSS) or "Free/Libre and Open-Source Software" (FLOSS) as a form of inclusive compromise, which brings free and open-source software advocates together to work on projects cohesively. Some users believe this is an ideal solution in order to promote both the user's freedom with the software and the pragmatic efficiency of an open-source development model. This view is reinforced by fact that majority of OSI-approved licenses and self-avowed open-source programs are also compatible with the free software formalisms and vice versa.

While free and open source software are often linked together, they offer two separate ideas and values. Richard Stallman has referred to open source as "a non-movement", as it "does not campaign for anything". 

"Open source" addresses software being open as a practical question  rather than an ethical dilemma – non-free software is not the best solution but nonetheless a solution. The free software movement views free software as a moral imperative: that proprietary software should be rejected, and that only free software should be developed and taught in order to make computing technology beneficial to the general public.

Although the movements have differing values and goals, collaborations between the Free Software Movement and Open Source Initiative have taken place when it comes to practical projects. By 2005, Richard Glass considered the differences to be a "serious fracture" but "vitally important to those on both sides of the fracture" and "of little importance to anyone else studying the movement from a software engineering perspective" since they have had "little effect on the field".

Criticism and controversy

Principle compromises 
Eric Raymond criticises the speed at which the free software movement is progressing, suggesting that temporary compromises should be made for long-term gains. Raymond argues that this could raise awareness of the software and thus increase the free software movement's influence on relevant standards and legislation.

Richard Stallman, on the other hand, sees the current level of compromise as a greater cause for worry.

Programmer income 

Stallman said that this is where people get the misconception of "free": there is no wrong in programmers' requesting payment for a proposed project, or charging for copies of free software. Restricting and controlling the user's decisions on use is the actual violation of freedom. Stallman defends that in some cases, monetary incentive is not necessary for motivation since the pleasure in expressing creativity is a reward in itself. Conversely, Stallman admits that it is not easy to raise money for free software projects.

"Viral" copyleft licensing 
The free software movement champions copyleft licensing schema (often pejoratively called "viral licenses"). In its strongest form, copyleft mandates that any works derived from copyleft-licensed software must also carry a copyleft license, so the license spreads from work to work like a computer virus might spread from machine to machine. Stallman has previously stated his opposition to describing the GNU GPL as "viral". These licensing terms can only be enforced through asserting copyrights.

Critics of copyleft licensing challenge the idea that restricting modifications is in line with the free software movement's emphasis on various "freedoms", especially when alternatives like MIT, BSD, and Apache licenses are more permissive. Proponents enjoy the assurance that copylefted work cannot usually be incorporated into non-free software projects. They emphasize that copyleft licenses may not attach for all uses and that in any case, developers can simply choose not to use copyleft-licensed software.

License proliferation and compatibility 

FLOSS license proliferation is a serious concern in the FLOSS domain due to increased complexity of license compatibility considerations which limits and complicates source code reuse between FLOSS projects. The OSI and the FSF maintain their own lists of dozens of existing and acceptable FLOSS licenses. There is an agreement among most that the creation of new licenses should be minimized and those created should be made compatible with the major existing FLOSS licenses. Therefore, there was a strong controversy around the update of the GNU GPLv2 to the GNU GPLv3 in 2007, as the updated license is not compatible with the previous version. Several projects (mostly of the open source faction like the Linux kernel) decided to not adopt the GPLv3 while almost all of the GNU project's packages adopted it.

See also 

 GNU Manifesto
 History of free software
 Linux adoption
 Open-source movement
 Free-culture movement
 Free Software Foundation
 Open Source Initiative
 Software Freedom Conservancy
 Free Software Movement of India
 Free Software Foundation of India
 Free Software Foundation Europe
 Free Software Movement Karnataka
 Free Software Foundation Tamil Nadu
 Swecha
 Gift economy

References

Further reading
 
 David M. Berry, Copy, Rip, Burn: The Politics of Copyleft and Open Source, Pluto Press, 2008, 
 Johan Söderberg, Hacking Capitalism: The Free and Open Source Software Movement, Routledge, 2007,

External links
 What is Free Software?  - Essay by Karl Fogel.
 The Free Software Movement and the Future of Freedom, a 2006 lecture by Richard Stallman
 Free Software Movement intro by FSF
 The GNU Project Philosophy Directory, containing many defining documents of the free software movement
 An interview with Stallman, "Free Software as a social movement"
 Christian Imhorst, Anarchy and Source Code - What does the Free Software Movement have to do with Anarchism?, (licence: GFDL), 2005
 An anti-DRM campaign - by Bill Xu and Richard Stallman
 [https://www.gnu.org/education/edu-schools.html Why Schools Should Exclusively Use Free Software
- GNU Project - Free Software Foundation]
 Stallman's Free Software Song

 
Copyleft media
Free software culture and documents